Divided Heaven is an East German drama film directed by Konrad Wolf. It was released in 1964.

Plot
While recovering from a mental breakdown, the young Rita Seidel recalls the last two years, in which she fell in love with Manfred, a chemist who is ten years older. As Manfred became disillusioned with his opportunities in East Germany, he moved to the West. Rita followed him there and tried to persuade him to return but soon realized he would never do it. Rita comes to terms with the past and decides to concentrate on her work and the building of a socialist society.  The film is set in the period immediately before the Berlin Wall was built.

Cast
 Renate Blume as Rita Seidel
 Eberhard Esche as Manfred Herrfurth
  as Meternagel
 Hilmar Thate as Ernst Wendland
  as Herrfurth
  as Mrs. Herrfurth
  as Ernst Schwarzenbach
  as Martin Jung
  as Sigrid
  as Hänschen
  as Ermisch
  as Kuhl
  as Karßuweit
  as Melcherr
  as Yuri Gagarin's voice

Production
The film's script was adapted from Christa Wolf's novel Der geteilte Himmel (Divided Heaven), released in 1963. Director Konrad Wolf (no relation to Christa Wolf's husband Gerhard Wolf) had read the author's manuscript before the book was published and decided to film it. The main filming took place in Halle from late 1963 to early 1964.

Reception
Der geteilte Himmel was viewed by 1.5 million people in the first year after its premiere. In 1965, Konrad Wolf and leading actor Eberhard Esche both received the Erich Weinert Medal for their work on the film.

West German newspaper Süddeutsche Zeitung described the film as "(i)mages of strict and restrained (black and white) beauty" Die Zeit's reviewer wrote "Although it was made by communists... Konrad and Christa Wolf had to break away from their belief in the party in order to make this picture... And that is why it is so convincing." West German author Hans Helmut Prinzler called it "the first candid attempt to portray the national consciousnesses in East Germany."

The film was removed from circulation on several occasions in the following years, when the Socialist Unity Party of Germany decreed it, depending on the political situation. In 1970, in one resolution to remove it a Ministry of Culture official concluded that it "unnecessarily over-stresses the theme of the flight from the Republic."

In 1995, a group of historians and cinema researchers chose Der geteilte Himmel as one of the 100 most important German films ever made.

On DVD with English subtitles
Divided Heaven was issued in June 2010 on Region 1 DVD by First Run Features. The subtitles are in only one language, English, with the descriptive text on the cover also indicated in English.  The English-subtitled DVD has not been reissued, but is available through DEFA Film Library.

References

External links
 
 
 Der geteilte Himmel original posters on ostfilm.de.

1964 films
1964 drama films
German drama films
East German films
1960s German-language films
German black-and-white films
Films directed by Konrad Wolf
Babelsberg Studio films
Films based on German novels
1960s German films